Choqa Zard may refer to:
 Choqa Zard, Kermanshah
 Choqa Zard, Mahidasht, Kermanshah Province